Dawid Nilsson (born 31 August 1977) is a retired Polish handball player and current coach of Stal Mielec.

References

1977 births
Living people
People from Sławno
Polish male handball players
Expatriate handball players
Polish expatriate sportspeople in Sweden
Polish expatriate sportspeople in Spain
Polish expatriate sportspeople in Denmark
Polish expatriate sportspeople in France
IFK Skövde players
Polish handball coaches